This article refers to the hospital in Englewood, Colorado. For the hospital in Seattle, Washington, see Swedish Medical Center.

Swedish Medical Center is a 408-bed acute care hospital located in Englewood, Colorado, United States. It is a Level I trauma and burn center serving Colorado and the Rocky Mountain region.

It is operated by HealthONE, part of HCA Healthcare's Continental Division.

History 
Swedish Medical Center was founded in 1905 in Colorado as a tuberculosis sanatorium. In 1924, the hospital was expanded with funds donated by the Swedish Women of Chicago. In 1956, with the decline of TB as a major health threat, the hospital's focus turned to general healthcare.

Swedish Medical Center was the first hospital in Colorado to use MRI and CT technology, as well as angiography. Swedish is a regional referral center for neurotrauma and in 2003 it was designated one of the three Level I Trauma Centers in Colorado. Swedish also became the first Comprehensive Stroke Center in Colorado in 2004.

Wayne F.J. Yakes, M.D. founded the Vascular Malformation Center in 1991.  It is the only center in the world that dedicates its care to the management of vascular malformations in all anatomic locations.

Swedish employs more than 2,000 people and has a medical staff of 1,400 physicians and allied health professionals. The hospital runs a health clinic at nearby Englewood High School.

Swedish was named one of the "100 Top Hospitals" in the nation by IBM Watson Health in 2020.

In 2016, the hospital warned patients that they may have been exposed to Hepatitis B, Hepatitis C and HIV as a result of a former employee's alleged drug tampering.

Notable patients
Four survivors of the Columbine High School massacre: Richard Castaldo, Sean Graves, Anne Marie Hochhalter, and Valeen "Val" Schnurr.

See also
Denver Health Medical Center
St. Anthony Hospital (Colorado)
Denver Paramedics

References

External links
Official Website
Solucient 100 Top Hospitals
Solucient 100 Top Hospitals

Hospital buildings completed in 1905
Hospitals in Colorado
HCA Healthcare
Englewood, Colorado
Buildings and structures in Arapahoe County, Colorado
Hospitals established in 1905
Swedish-American culture in Colorado
1905 establishments in Colorado
Tuberculosis sanatoria in the United States